Starhill Towers & Gallery in Dubai is a twin-tower  waterfront development consisting of freehold offices, a 5-star hotel and a luxury shopping mall.

This project was expected to be delivered by 2010 and was completed on schedule.

See also
 List of buildings in Dubai

References

External links
 ETA STAR
 Emporis

Skyscraper hotels in Dubai
Skyscraper office buildings in Dubai